Rebecca Hotchkiss is a fictional character on the NBC/DirecTV soap opera, Passions. Rebecca has been played by both Maureen McCormick (July 5 to August 17, 2000) and Andrea Evans (September 1, 2000, to August 7, 2008), neither of whom were ever on contract. The character's maiden name has never been revealed, although Tabitha has referred to Rebecca being an Osborn woman. Although now divorced from both Jonathan and Julian, Rebecca uses the surname Hotchkiss Crane.

Storylines

Rebecca grew up as a shy, conservative young woman bathed in riches, and beauty, and was descended from a wealthy respected family. However, Rebecca's came from a long line of Osborn women who were seemingly very manipulative and cunning. One even arranged for John Wilkes Booth to assassinate Abraham Lincoln just for spiting her. Rebecca favored these ancestors, and was very eye-catching toward the men in her day. During her teens she fell for a local boy in her hometown, but was unable to be with him due to their different social strata's. At age 17, when she was a bridesmaid to her friend Ivy Winthrop's wedding, she slept with the groom's father, Alistair Crane. It was Alistair who introduced Rebecca to "satisfy the appetite of men".

After her family forced her to end a relationship, Rebecca set her sights on Jonathan Hotchkiss. Soon Rebecca stole Jonathan from his fiancée Clarissa Morton, and married him. They had only one child together, a daughter named Gwen. Their marriage went sour, as Rebecca soon learned that Jonathan, who was broke, had only married her for her money. Rebecca's eye later wandered, and she committed adultery with tabloid editor JT Cornell.

Rebecca was thrilled when Ethan Crane and Gwen met and fell in love, because she always wanted her daughter to be rich and powerful, and happy. When she found out that Theresa Lopez-Fitzgerald and Ethan were involved, she immediately warned her daughter. Rebecca recognized the same lies and manipulations from what she herself had done as a younger woman.

Rebecca's warnings didn't help, because Ethan postponed the wedding and began seeing both women, getting disinherited as a result. After Gwen returned her engagement ring, Rebecca was determined to get not only her daughter, but also herself in the Crane house, and get revenge on what she believed to be gold-digger for scheming to break up Gwen and Ethan's relationship in the first place. It's possible Rebecca saw her husband in Theresa, as he had once married her for her considerable fortune.

She began an affair with Julian Crane, whom she nicknamed "Pookie", the plan to eventually get him to ask her to marry him. Then she found the proof of Ethan's paternity on Theresa's laptop, and she and Gwen used Theresa's e-mail to send it to the tabloids. She  set up a plan, filed for a divorce from her husband so she could have Julian for herself. She married Julian in a quick wedding ceremony after he signed the annulment papers with Theresa, but when it was discovered that Julian and Theresa had supposedly consummated their marriage, that nullified the documents, so Rebecca had no cent to her name. Although it was eventually discovered that Julian and Theresa's marriage was invalid, there was no mention of the fact that Rebecca's marriage to Julian was therefore valid, and Rebecca had to blackmail Julian to marry her by threatening to expose Eve Russell to her family.

Blackmailing Julian wasn't her only plan though. Rebecca decided to turn the tables on Theresa and make Theresa pay for everything she had done to Gwen over the years by taking her son away. She had an even deeper motive; she planned to arrange for Ethan and Gwen to adopt Theresa's son, to replace the child Sarah Winthrop that they had lost. Although Rebecca came to care deeply about her stepson, she firmly believed he was better off without Theresa in his life, and knew that Gwen and Ethan could provide him with both love and stability. After child protective services deemed Theresa an unfit mother and the courts terminated her parental rights, Rebecca used her influence to get Julian to sign away his rights to his son and to convince Judge Reilly to approve Ethan and Gwen's adoption of the boy. When she learned that the baby Theresa was carrying for Ethan and Gwen could be the result of Theresa's rape of Ethan, Rebecca swore to finally get her vengeance on the girl who had caused her daughter so much pain. At the same time, Rebecca, desperate to keep her husband, decided to poison Eve Russell.

Rebecca never did get caught for poisoning Eve. When the case went to trial, with Eve accused of poisoning Alistair, Julian and Liz Sanbourne (who had drunk the poison Rebecca had intended for Eve), Rebecca manipulated Julian into signing a document that promised he would never divorced her—then took the stand and pointed the finger at Liz. Julian kept his promise to stay married to her, but still have Eve. When Gwen became worried that JT Cornell would tell Theresa the truth about the tabloid article, Rebecca used her past with JT to keep him quiet—until Theresa offered him money. She was hoping that since Eve is getting closer to TC so that Julian would leave Eve and get back together with her. Eve eventually broke off their engagement, however he didn't go back to Rebecca.

Julian and Rebecca were recently revealed to be divorced. Although the two are no longer married Julian and Rebecca still have sex. Rebecca is also sleeping with JT. JT eventually was murdered by a blackmailer whose identity is yet to be revealed. Rebecca has sought to "avenge" JT's memory by finding out all of his secrets. Soon Rebecca and Gwen learned JT's greatest secret: the true paternity of Ethan Crane, Theresa's son. The two plotted to reveal the truth to Ethan, Little Ethan's real father at an opportune moment.

After the failed wedding between Paloma and Noah, and Fancy and Luis, Rebecca was knocked unconscious while wearing the blackmailer's signature male/female clothing. She was shocked to learn the real blackmailer had tricked her into wearing his clothing, and even more shocked to find out from Gwen that the Blackmailer's true identity was Vincent Clarkson. Both she and Gwen later tried to prevent Theresa's marriage to Ethan, but failed. They later assisted the newly resurrected Alistair Crane in poisoning Theresa, but their plan backfired leaving Ethan in a coma, Theresa emotionally shattered, and Chad Harris-Crane, Ethan's best friend dead.

Rebecca was shocked to learn Gwen had secretly given birth to a son, Jonathan Winthrop. She was one of the first to notice that her grandson was constantly ill. Rebecca also discovered Pilar Lopez-Fitzgerald's secret history in JT's files, regarding her connection to the Vasquez family massacre. Information which she, and Gwen used to make both Pilar and Theresa do their bidding.

Rebecca is relentless to see her daughter with the man she loves, even if it means the death of her grandson. Though the baby pulled through thanks to a liver transplant by Theresa's son Ethan, Rebecca threatened Pilar to keep quiet, and helped her daughter to misinterpret Theresa's selfless actions in Ethan's mind. When a wedge was established between the couple, Rebecca warned Gwen to be cautious of both Theresa and Esme Vanderheusen the best friend of Fancy Crane, and a notorious man user. Rebecca was accidentally stabbed by Esme's niece Viki, an unknowingly unstable serial killer. Though Rebecca survived she accidentally revealed to Ethan minor details about the Vasquez family when she learned Theresa and Pilar had gone to Mexico because of the threats of Juanita Vasquez. When Ethan left for Mexico, and Gwen followed Rebecca urged her daughter by phone to kill Pilar. When Gwen could not go through with it and revealed that Juanita had learned of their blackmailing schemes, Rebecca decided to leave Harmony, but was prevented by Sam Bennett, and Viki. Both Rebecca and Gwen were sent to jail for their various crimes; such as blackmail, fraud, bribery, and murder of not only Pilar's sister and nephews in Mexico, but also attempted murder on everyone in the basement of the church, when they were finally exposed in the series finale, mainly no thanks to Rebecca and her annoying babbling, one of her least attractive traits. During the series finale, Rebecca's babbling revealed that Gwen's marriage to Ethan was invalid due to Gwen already being married from a trip to Las Vegas.

Notes

References

External links

soapcentral.com|PS Online
Rebecca at Soap Central

Hotchkiss, Rebecca
Fictional socialites
Television characters introduced in 2000
Female characters in television